1971 Masters may refer to:
1971 Masters Tournament, golf
1971 Pepsi-Cola Masters, tennis